Oswego High School is a public coeducational four-year high school in Oswego, NY. It is the only public school serving grades 9-12 in the Oswego City School District. The principal is Ryan Lanigan. Assistant principals are Tara Clark and Kirk Mulverhill. The dean of students is Penny Morley.

Extracurricular activities

Athletics 
Oswego High School teams compete in Section III of the New York State Public High School Athletic Association. Athletic facilities at the school include two gymnasiums, a swimming pool, a weight room, two softball fields, a baseball field, a track, and two multipurpose fields used for football, lacrosse, and soccer. Many events are held at Field, which hosts the track as well as a large athletic field.

Boys teams
 Baseball
 Basketball
 Bowling
 Cross Country
 Football
 Golf
 Ice hockey
 Indoor Track
 Lacrosse
 Soccer
 Swimming
 Tennis
 Track & Field
 Volleyball
 Wrestling

Girls teams
 Basketball
Bowling
 Cheerleading
 Cross Country
 Golf
 Gymnastics
 Ice hockey
 Indoor Track
 Lacrosse
 Soccer
 Softball
 Swimming
 Tennis
 Track & Field
 Volleyball

Other options
Aside from the interscholastic sports teams, Oswego High School offers various other opportunities. Each October the school hosts a powderpuff football game where it formerly was girls of the junior class face off against senior girls.It is now open to both girls and boys.In addition, the school offers a downhill ski club, co-founded by Eric Tyler, Don Canfield, Chris Moss, and Alan Leighton in 1974, in which members take approximately six after-school ski trips to Labrador Mountain each year in the months of January and February.

Music

Oswego High School offers a music program including two orchestras, three choruses, three concert bands, and two jazz bands, which are offered as classes during the school day and perform an average of three concerts per year, generally in December for Christmas, March for Music In Our Schools Month, and May or June to honor graduating seniors.

Oswego's music program also includes the Marching Buccaneers marching band, which competes in the Small School I Class of the New York State Field Band Conference. Notable recent achievements include the Marching Bucs' first-place ranking at James Madison University's Parade of Champions in 2002, 2005 and 2009.

The chorus program, in conjunction with the drama program, also puts on an annual musical. In 2016, they performed Damn Yankees, and were nominated for twelve out of a possible fifteen awards at the Syracuse High School Theatre Awards. Past productions include Pippin, Oliver!, Crazy for You, My Fair Lady, Beauty and the Beast, Les Misérables, and Grease.

The Paradox

The Paradox is Oswego High School's award-winning yearbook. It has won numerous awards from the Empire State School Press Association and the Columbia School Press Association.

The Buccaneer Bulletin

The Buccaneer Bulletin is Oswego High School's monthly newspaper, which has been awarded numerous gold medals from the Empire State School Press Association. Members of the staff have been recognized individually by the Newspapers in Education program.

WBUC

Students involved with WBUC at Oswego High School produce the morning announcements in an on-campus studio, which are broadcast to televisions in all classrooms as well as throughout the public locally on Time Warner cable channel 16.

Statistics

Diversity

 1% Asian
 5% Hispanic
 1% African-American
 93% Caucasian

Gender

 50% female
 50% male"

Graduation rate

Oswego High School has a graduation rate of 75%, below the New York State average of 86%.

Post graduation plans

 48% plan to attend a four-year college in New York State
 8% plan to attend a four-year college out of state
 26% plan to attend a two-year college in New York State
 3% plan to attend post secondary institutions in New York State

Expenditures per pupil

An estimated $22,029 is spent annually per student.

 68% instructional
 6% student & staff support
 10% administration
 17% other

Teacher credentials

 2% of teachers have no valid teaching certificate
 5% of teachers have less than 3 years of experience
 21% of teachers have a master's degree or above

Notable alumni
Erik Cole, former NHL Player (2000-2015), and Stanley Cup Winner (2006), although he did not finish school at Oswego High School.
Noel Francisco, class President, graduated 1987, 47th Solicitor General of the United States
Willard A. Kitts, Vice admiral, USN and recipient of the Navy Cross
Howie McCann, former coach of the Marshall Thundering Herd baseball team 
Robert Natoli, strongman
Sarah Corbin Robert, 17th President General of the Daughters of the American Revolution
Curtis F. Shoup (January 11, 1921 – January 7, 1945) received the Medal of Honor for acts of bravery near Tillet in Belgium (now a deelgemeente of Sainte-Ode) on January 7, 1945. He was a graduate of Oswego High School in Oswego, New York.

References

Public high schools in New York (state)
Schools in Oswego County, New York